Events in the year 1851 in India.

Incumbents
James Broun-Ramsay, 1st Marquess of Dalhousie, Governor-General of India, 1848 to 1856
Vyankatrao I Raje Ghorpade, Raja of Mudhol State, 20 February 1818-December 1854
Muhammad Said Khan, Nawab of Rampur from 1840 to 1855, died on 1 April
Ghulam Muhammad Ghouse Khan, Nawab of the Carnatic, 1825-1855
Chintaman Rao I "Appa Sahib", founder and Rao of Sangli State, 1782–15 July 1851
Dhundi Rao Chintaman Rao "Tatya Sahib", Rao of Sangli State, 15 July 1851-12 December 1901
Gumansinhji, Maharawal of Chhota Udaipur State, 1822-1851
Jitsinhji, Maharawal of Chhota Udaipur State, 1851-1881
Ram Baksh, Prime Minister of Hyderabad, September 1849–April 1851
Ganesh Rao, April 1851–June 1851
Ratan Singh, Maharajah of Bikaner State, 25 March 1828-7 August 1851
Sardar Singh, Maharajah of Bikaner State, 7 August 1851–16 May 1872

Events
The first experimental electric telegraph line, between Calcutta and Diamond Harbour, was opened for the British East India Company
Oriental Bank Corporation was chartered to allow competition with the East India Company's opium billing monopoly
Naga raided the East India Company from 1851-1865
The first train in India had become operational on 22 December for localised hauling of canal construction material in Roorkee
British Indian Association, a pan-nationalist political group, was established on 31 October
Dadabhai Naoroji founded the Rahnumae Mazdayasne Sabha (Guides on the Mazdayasne Path) on 1 August
Mongnawng State gained independence from Hsenwi State
Murree was established in the Punjab
Roman Catholic Archdiocese of Hyderabad was established as Apostolic Vicariate of Hyderabad from the Apostolic Vicariate of Madras
Holy Trinity Church, Bangalore was built
Government Museum, Chennai was established

Law
The British Parliament passed the Lunatics Removal (India) Act 1851 and Marriages, India Act
 Indian Tolls Act
Court of Chancery Act (British statute)
Lunatics Removal (India) Act

Births
Mahmud al-Hasan, a Deobandi scholar who actively campaigned against Britain's rule in India, born in Bareilly, Uttar Pradesh
Jaswant Singh of Bharatpur, ruled Bharatpur State, born in Deeg on 1 March
Henry George Impey Siddons, an Indian educationist, born in Indore
Harry Charles Purvis Bell, British civil servant and a commissioner in the Ceylon Civil Service
Henry Stephens Salt, British writer and social reformer, born on 20 September

Deaths
Ayya Vaikundar, also known as Historical Vaikundar, who effectively founded the Ayyavazhi religion, died on 3 June
Chintaman Rao I "Appa Sahib", founder of Sangli State, died on 15 July 1851
Ratan Singh, Maharajah of Bikaner State, died on 7 August 1851
John Elliot Drinkwater Bethune, Anglo-Indian lawyer and a pioneer in promoting women's education, died on 12 August in Kolkata

References

 
India
Years of the 19th century in India